Southern Airways Express, doing business as Mokulele Airlines, is an American commuter airline operating in Hawaii. The airline operates scheduled inter-island and charter flights among all Hawaiian islands with airports. Mokulele Airlines was the first FAA Part 135 Scheduled Airline to have approved iPad "Flight bags" for its pilots. In 2019, it was acquired by Southern Airways Express, but it continues to operate as its own brand within the larger airline. In June 2020, Makanai Kai Air was also acquired by Southern, and its aircraft now fly in Mokulele livery.

History

Mokulele Flight Service and Mokulele Airlines
The airline was founded in 1994 as Mokulele Flight Service by Rebecca "Kawehi" Inaba and was the first airline in Hawaii to be founded by a Native Hawaiian woman. In 2005 it was acquired by Boyer Industries LLC, headed by former baggage handler turned entrepreneur William "Bill" Boyer Jr., who became the airline's CEO.  The company, at this point, had a fleet of three Piper Navajo Chieftains and was operating only charters and sightseeing trips to Hawaiʻi Volcanoes National Park, as well as scenic flights around the Big Island and Maui.  Mr. Boyer worked on obtaining scheduled authority for Mokulele to begin service to Kahului, Maui from both Kailua-Kona and Hilo, Hawai'i.

In September 2006, the airline announced that it had reached an agreement with Mesa Air Group and its go! division, whereby Mokulele would operate Cessna Grand Caravan aircraft to Kapalua, Molokai, and Lanai under the name go!Express. Service began with flights from Kapalua to Honolulu, Kahului, and Kona on April 17, 2007. Service began for flights to Molokai on July 21, 2007, and flights to Lanai on October 6, 2007.

In January 2008, the airline reached an agreement with Aloha Airlines to provide cargo service to Molokai, Lanai, and Kapalua under the name Aloha Cargo Express beginning in April using a Cessna 208 Cargomaster.  Following Aloha's March 2008 bankruptcy, Boyer indicated that he had an agreement with Aloha CEO David Banmiller to work with the buyer of Aloha's cargo operations to continue the Mokulele-Aloha contract.  Boyer also stated that the airline would go ahead with cargo operations under its own name, Mokulele Air Cargo.

In October 2008, Mokulele announced that it had reached an agreement with Republic Airways Holdings to provide inter-island jet service.  On November 19, Republic's Shuttle America began operating two Embraer 170 regional jet aircraft on flights between Honolulu, Lihue, and Kona under the Mokulele name, with additional aircraft and destinations to be added in 2009.  As a result of Mokulele's entrance into markets that compete directly with go!, that airline later announced that it would end the go!Express agreement with Mokulele in April 2009.

In December 2008, Mokulele Airlines announced partnerships with two larger North American airlines.  The first, with Alaska Airlines, allows members of Alaska's Mileage Plan frequent flyer program to earn and redeem miles on Mokulele flights, with a code-sharing agreement hoped for in early 2009.  The second, with WestJet Airlines, provides access to Mokulele's inter-island flights to WestJet's customers, including sightseeing air tours. Each airline was to promote the other on their respective websites.  Mokulele continued to operate flights on behalf of go! Express while also operating its own, independent brand.

After running into financial difficulties earlier in the year, the airline announced in March 2009 that Republic had taken a 50% stake in the company.  Boyer relinquished the CEO position to Republic vice president Scott Durgin, moving to head the airline's sales and marketing efforts.  Republic also assumed control of the Cessna Grand Caravan aircraft operated by Mokulele. A few days later, Mesa announced that the change of CEO allows the airline to terminate its agreement with Mokulele early, and would terminate the agreement effective March 24, 2009 and nullifying Mokulele agreement to operate Caravans as "go! express."

go! Mokulele joint venture
In October 2009, Mokulele announced that it was going to join go! and become go! Mokulele. Peter Forman, an airline historian, said that the merger would cause air fares in Hawaii to increase, since go! and Mokulele no longer compete with one another. The merger agreement included a joint venture, with 75% of the joint venture owned by Mesa and 25% owned by Mokulele shareholders.  Mesa decreased the size of the operation to just 4 Cessna Grand Caravans.

New Mokulele Airlines
In November 2011, Mesa Air Group announced that it had sold the go! Mokulele turboprop operation, operated by Mokulele Airlines, to Scottsdale, Arizona-based Transpac Aviation Inc. go!Mokulele's turboprop services continued to be operated by Mokulele under a code share agreement. On Friday, December 9, Mokulele grounded its fleet in conjunction with an internal record-keeping audit. Flights resumed the following Monday.

In December 2011, the airline unveiled plans to begin operating a charter service from Honolulu to Rockford, Illinois and London. When the service was approved by the U.S. Department of Transportation the following month, the schedule showed a Boeing 767-200ER leased from Air Transport International would operate the flights, with the Honolulu to Rockford segment beginning on April 13, 2012, and the Rockford to London segment starting May 4. On April 8, the airline delayed the start of service until at least October.  In early 2012, Mesa Air Group announced it would rebrand its jets operations back to the go! name as the name go!Mokulele and Mokulele was causing some brand confusion among the two companies. The airline also abandoned its non-turboprop charter plans so it could focus on service in the isles.

In April 2012, the airline started operating daily service between Maui and Lanai. In July 2012, the airline returned to Kapalua Airport in West Maui, with flights from Honolulu to Kapalua twice per day.

In October 2012, the airline brought a new city to the network, Hana, located on the far east side of Maui. The flights operate twice a day under a partnership with the owners of the resort in Hana. The airline also outsourced eight flights a day to Schuman Aviation - Makani Kai, to bring additional frequencies on the Maui - Kona route, bringing the total daily flights to fifteen on peak days, each way.  When Island Air announced plans to retire their fleet of Dash 8 aircraft, Mokulele jumped on the opportunity and ordered additional Caravans to fill the gap. 

In March 2014, Mesa Airlines announced the shut down of its go! division in Hawai'i - ending the codeshare relationship between Mesa and Mokulele, allowing the airline to now operate additional flights that were previously prohibited by the codeshare agreement. On April 11, 2014, Mokulele began commuter flights linking Honolulu and Kahului Airport in Maui. The airline also began working with Hawai'i Department of Transportation and Oahu County officials on linking Kahului and Barbers Point/Kalaeloa/John Rodgers Field in West Oahu, and on May 13, 2014, confirmed that flights would begin on July 1.

Starting in February 2015, Mokulele Airlines entered into a one-year wet-lease agreement with Sun Air to provide up to 4 aircraft and crews for Sun Air's EAS Pittsburgh flying. In May 2015, Mokulele and officials publicly announced plans to launch new service in Florida scheduled to begin on November 15, 2015; but it withdrew its plans, claiming that it needed more time to conduct research and that it had been threatened by competitor Silver Airways.

On November 26, 2015, Mokulele Airlines changed its ICAO code to MHO, and its callsign to "Mahalo" for its Hawai‘i flight operations.  2016 also saw the company start a brand-refresh and new services in California.

California expansion

In February 2016, Mokulele Airlines re-applied for Essential Air Service subsidy for Imperial County Airport and Visalia Municipal Airport after SeaPort Airlines terminated service in late January. Imperial County selected Mokulele, but Visalia voted instead to shift from EAS to request $3.7 million from the Community Flexibility Pilot Program, which pays cities to forego subsidized air service for 10 years in favor of a direct payment of two years’ worth of subsidies. Officials expressed concern over low ridership and a pilot shortage, and Mokulele proposed using the same type of aircraft that SeaPort Airlines flew.

In March 2016, the airline announced that it was considering serving Visalia without a subsidy, but did not pursue. The airline's service to Los Angeles International Airport from Imperial County Airport began on May 23 and from Santa Maria Public Airport on October 10, 2016; with Inyokern Airport scheduled for early 2017.  Los Angeles flights were scaled back after congestion added significant taxi and flight times to its operations out of Los Angeles, all related to runway construction at the airport.

Acquisition by Southern Airways Express 
On February 8, 2019 Southern Airways Express purchased the assets of Mokulele Flight Service, Inc. from Transpac Holdings.  The company believed by adding Mokulele Airlines to its portfolio, it can lead to additional growth and opportunities, notably its relationship with American Airlines.  On May 24, 2019, Mokulele announced it would restore the link between Kahului, Maui and Lana'i City on June 17, 2019, a route it had flown until 2016. The full merger with Southern Airways was completed in February 2020.

On March 28, 2022 it was announced that Air Choice One was also acquired by the Southern Airways Corporation (SAC), parent company of Southern Airways Express, but keeping both air operator's certificates separate.

Electric aircraft 
In early 2019, Mokulele provided one of its Cessna Grand Caravan to Ampaire, a startup company based in Los Angeles. The company will equip the Caravan with an electric powertrain with plans to introduce commercial service by 2023. Demonstration flights of the Electric EEL were completed in December 2020 on the Kahului to Hana route to test the propulsion system in an operational environment. In early 2021, Ampaire was acquired by commuter airline, Surf Air. Mokulele predicts to implement the new power-plant system on Essential Air Service routes for the next contract period (in 2025).

Makani Kai Air merger 
In 2020, Southern Airways Express announced the merger of its subsidy Mokulele with Makani Kai Air. Flights will continue to operate and be sold under the Mokulele brand. Operations began to combine on June 15, 2020, and were completed by the end of the year. Makani Kai Air owner Richard Schuman has joined Southern/Mokulele as Executive Vice President - Hawaii.

Awards 
Mokulele Airlines has historically been voted as "Hawai'i's #1 Island Hopper" or Commuter Airline by the local news media, along with awards for the "Best Air Tour". 

In 2019, Trip Advisor ranked Mokulele Airlines as the Best Specialty/Leisure Airline in North America.

Destinations

Southern Airways Express operates flights under the Mokulele brand to the following destinations within the state of Hawaii:

Former

Fleet

Mokulele Airlines operates the following aircraft:

Accidents and incidents

References

External links

Mokulele Airlines
Television interview with Mokulele Air Owner Bill Boyer, 1/24/2008

Companies based in Hawaii
Transportation in Hawaii County, Hawaii
Airlines established in 1994
Airlines based in Hawaii
Republic Airways
Regional airlines of the United States
1994 establishments in Hawaii